Kryptos is an Indian heavy metal band from Bangalore, India, formed in 1998 by Nolan Lewis (vocals/guitars) and Ganesh K. (bassist). They are one of the pioneers of the modern Indian heavy metal movement. Since their inception the band has released six albums: Spiral Ascent (2004), The Ark of Gemini (2008),The Coils of Apollyon (2013), Burn Up The Night (2016), Afterburner (2019) and Force of Danger (2021).

History

Early years (1998–2003)
Kryptos was formed in late 1998, Essentially a classic heavy metal band—they focus on fusing NWOBHM styling with elements of 1980s thrash metal. Their primary influences include Black Sabbath, Judas Priest and Iron Maiden along with secondary influences such as Coroner, Kreator, Mercyful Fate, and Candlemass.

Debut album (2004) 
Their debut album Spiral Ascent  quickly spread through the underground circuit in India as well as countries like Germany, Argentina and other parts of Europe. The album although long being out of print and is today considered a landmark release in Indian metal history. Dark Tranquillity's Niklas Sundin designed the album sleeve.

Signing with Old School Metal Records and second studio album (2006–2009)
Kryptos signed with Old School Metal Records from California, United States in April 2006  and became one of the first metal bands from India to sign with an international metal label. Vocalist/bassist Ganesh K. and guitarist Akshay 'Axe' Patel left the band in November 2006 which led to various changes in Kryptos' line-up. Nolan Lewis took up lead vocal and guitarist duties. Rohit Chaturvedi and Jayawant Tewari were hired to fill the further incumbent guitarist and bassist positions.

Kryptos entered the studios later that year to record the follow up to their debut album and emerged in mid-2008 with their second album:The Ark of Gemini, which received excellent reviews from different parts of the world and also enjoyed a fair amount of airplay on U.S. and European metal radio stations.

Supporting Iron Maiden (2009)
Kryptos landed the supporting slot for Iron Maiden at Rock 'N India 2009 in their home town Bangalore—playing to almost 17,000 fans at the Palace Grounds.

The Coils of Apollyon (2012) 
The Coils of Apollyon was released on 18 February 2012 in India and 21 September 2012 internationally.

Tours

Early tours (Invasion Europa 2010 and Into the Spectral Void 2013) 
In July 2010 Kryptos became the first Indian metal band to complete a cross-country tour of Europe, playing at the Rockmarathon festival in Hungary, in the Flammeng Open Air festival in Germany, as well as many more club gigs throughout Germany and Switzerland.

The band kick-started the year 2012 by supporting folk/melodic death metal band Suidakra and German thrash metal pioneers Kreator at the inaugural edition of the Bangalore Open Air in June 2012.

November of the same year saw them support Swedish power metal band Wolf at the third edition of the Harley Rock Riders festival.

The band opened for Testament, whom they happen to consider an important musical influence, at the NH7 Festival in Bangalore.

In 2013 Kryptos again toured Europe playing at festivals like In Flammeng Open Air, Ragnarock Open Air, and most notably Wacken Open Air, becoming the first Indian band ever to play at Wacken Open Air.

Signing with Seaside Touring and present events (2014–present) 
In 2014 the band started the year with an appearance at Inferno Metal Festival in Norway and later announced a partnership with Seaside Touring. They again played the Bangalore Open Air opening for Destruction and Rotting Christ.

In September 2014 they announced their Europe tour: 'Apollyon Rising'. The tour started with the show at Hamburg Metal Dayz followed by 17 tour dates in countries such as Germany, Belgium, Italy, Austria, Hungary, Czech Republic, Slovakia and Switzerland.

The 17 days tour was part of the Wacken Road Show.

In 2016 the band supported American thrash metal band Death Angel in Germany and played a one-off show with Nervosa, Hirax and The Black Dahlia Murder in the Austrian town of Dornbirn.

In 2017 the band opened for Swedish heavy metal band Katatonia at Saarang, Indian Institute of Technology Madras and followed it up with a European summer tour supporting American thrash metal band Sacred Reich on the 30 Years of Ignorance tour, which included dates in Germany, Austria and The Netherlands, as well as appearances at Rockharz Open Air and Wacken Open Air. This tour would prove to be the most defining in the band's history and laid the foundation for their first headlining tour in 2019, which included a first concert in Malta.

In 2018 long time drummer Anthony Hoover announced his departure from the band. Since then, Vijit Singh took over drum duties and joined the band on a permanent basis.

Band members

Present
 Nolan Lewis - vocals (2005–present), rhythm guitar (1998–present)
 Rohit Chaturvedi - lead guitar (2006–present)
 Ganesh Krishnaswamy - vocals (1998-2005), bass (1998-2005, 2013–present)
 Vijit Singh - drums (2019–present)

Former
 Akshay 'Axe' Patel - lead guitars (2001-2006)
 Jayawant Tewari - bass guitar (2005-2013)
 Ching Len - drums (1998-2000)
 Ryan Colaco - drums (2000-2013)
 Anthony Hoover - drums (2013–2018)

Timeline

Discography

Studio releases
 Spiral Ascent (2004)
 The Ark of Gemini (2008)
 The Coils of Apollyon (2012)
 Burn Up The Night (2016)
 Afterburner (2019)
 Force of Danger (2021)

See also
Indian rock
Demonic Resurrection
Nicotine
Inner Sanctum
Scribe
Bhayanak Maut

References

External links
 Official Website
 Kryptos at MySpace
 Kryptos at Last.fm
 Kryptos at Reverbnation

Indian heavy metal musical groups
Musical groups established in 1998
Thrash metal musical groups
Musical quartets